Friston is a village and civil parish in the East Suffolk district, in the county of Suffolk, England. The River Alde bounds the village on the south. The surrounding land is chiefly arable. The soil becomes partly marshy in the lower grounds. The village is noted for its early nineteenth century post mill. It is located next to the village of Knodishall.

Its name is recorded in the Domesday Book as Frisetuna and seems to come from Anglo-Saxon Frīsa tūn = "the farmstead of the Frisians"; some of them may have come with the Angles and Saxons. An alternative name for the parish is Freston.

In 1887, John Bartholomew described Friston as:Friston, par. and vil., E. Suffolk, 3 miles SE. of Saxmundham, 1846 ac., pop. 385; P.O.; in NW. vicinity of vil. is Friston Hall.

Population 
According to the most recent census in 2011, the parishes male population was 164 and the female population was 180. The historical reports show that Friston's total population in 1841 was 455 with 210 people being under 20 and 245 people being 20 years and upwards indicating the parishes young population. The population graph from 1801 to 2011 shows an increase in population from 1801 to 1850 where it declined to just under 400 people. After this point the population of Friston fluctuated but continued increasing before the huge decline in the village's population around the 1970s which was common in most rural areas due to people migrating to metropolitan areas with higher accessibility for social and economic activities.

Industry 
The 1881 occupational graph demonstrates that the most common occupations for men were in agriculture and commodities with approximately 30 men working in each of these occupations. The second most popular occupation was house construction with 9 men working in that occupation. Females occupations differ in comparison with 17 females employed in domestic services such as transporters of messages and 56 females without specified occupations suggesting they worked around their homes.

Community 
Friston is located in a rural area close to the sea, rivers and woodland area. Friston is close to a famous bird sanctuary in Minsmere and is also home to its own wind mill dating back to the 19th century called 'Frison Post Mill'. The village has its own church, called St Mary's Church. The village which once had nine shops has now seen closure to its school and its post office; it is however close to surrounding towns with shops and supermarkets. There are two cinemas and a theatre within four miles of the village. Friston has a village Parish Council which hosts an annual general meeting with its seven members and the clerk. The village has a thriving pub called 'Old Chequers Pub' with a traditional log burner and was referred to as a 'community asset' after fears of it being sold for residential development in 2014.

Housing 
Friston is a desirable location which has meant that there is a big amount of non-residential housing and properties are at a premium. On average a three bedroom semi-detached house costs £375,000 and to rent a two bedroom house costs approximately £700 per calendar month.

Church 
The Church at Friston, called St Mary's Church dates back to the Norman period with the main body of the church dating back to the 14th century. The church is built with a nave, chancel, west tower and south porch which is the ideal parish church plan. The Church contains a Tudor Bible written in 1550 and is possibly the first bible to have ever been used in St Mary's church. The church also has a churchyard which has several graves of the Bowater family members, of which three were Lord Mayors of London.

Friston Post Mill 
Friston post mill was built in 1812 and is the tallest of its type in England. It was said to have been built by John Collins before getting sold to Joseph Colling of Bramfield and then getting sold to John Wells of Halesworth for £40 in 1813. The Mill has been repaired ever since it was built, in 1976 there were 7 major repairs because it was affected by Deathwatch beetle infestation. The Mill was updated in August 1983 and was described as: Post Windmill, Early C19; partly restored 1977. Timber framed and weatherboarded body on 3-storey painted brick roundhouse. Fantain and sails removed. The principal machinery, which drove 3 pairs of millstones, remains intact. An outstanding landmark.

References

External links

Villages in Suffolk
Civil parishes in Suffolk